This is a list of school districts in the Northwest Territories.

 Beaufort-Delta Education Council
 Commission scolaire francophone, Territories du Nord-Ouest
 Dehcho Divisional Education Council
 Sahtu Divisional Education Council
 South Slave Divisional Education Council
 Tlicho Community Services Agency
 Yellowknife Catholic School Board
 Yellowknife Education District No. 1

There is also a Montessori School in Yellowknife that does not fall under the above school districts, and the Commission scolaire francophone des Territoires du Nord-Ouest that operates schools in Yellowknife and Hay River.

References

School districts in the Northwest Territories

School districts
Education in the Northwest Territories
Northwest Territories, school districts